
Gmina Wałcz is a rural gmina (administrative district) in Wałcz County, West Pomeranian Voivodeship, in north-western Poland. Its seat is the town of Wałcz, although the town is not part of the territory of the gmina.

The gmina covers an area of  making it second largest in country. As of 2006 its total population is 12,424.

Villages
Gmina Wałcz contains the villages and settlements of Boguszyn, Brzezinki, Bukowa Góra, Chude, Chwiram, Czapla, Czechyń, Czepiec, Dębołęka, Dobino, Dobrogoszcz, Dobrzyca, Dobrzyca Leśna, Dzikowo, Glinki, Głowaczewo, Golce, Górnica, Gostomia, Iłowiec, Jarogniewie, Jeziorko, Karsibór, Kłębowiec, Kłosowo, Kołatnik, Kolno, Łąki, Laski Wałeckie, Lipie, Lubno, Ługi Wałeckie, Morzyca, Nagórze, Nakielno, Nowa Szwecja, Olszynka, Omulno, Ostrowiec, Papowo, Piława, Pluskota, Popowo, Prusinówko, Prusinowo Wałeckie, Przybkowo, Różewo, Rudki, Rudnica, Rusinowo, Rutwica, Sitowo, Smoląg, Sosnówka, Strączno, Świętosław, Szwecja, Wałcz Drugi, Witankowo and Zdbice.

Neighbouring gminas
Gmina Wałcz is bordered by the town of Wałcz and by the gminas of Czaplinek, Człopa, Jastrowie, Mirosławiec, Szydłowo, Trzcianka, Tuczno and Wierzchowo.

References

Polish official population figures 2006

Walcz
Wałcz County